James Godday (born 9 January 1984) is a Nigerian athlete who specializes in 400 metres. He was born in Kaduna.

Godday was a part of the Nigerian team that won the bronze medal in the 2004 Olympics 4 x 400 metres relay. In the 2005 World Championships in Helsinki, he competed in 400 metres where he was knocked out in the semi finals with 46.62. He achieved a personal best in the heats with 45.30. He later improved this to 44.99 seconds, in February 2006 in Abuja.

He finished fifth at the 2006 African Championships and fourth at the 2007 All-Africa Games.

References

External links 
 
 
 

1984 births
Living people
Nigerian male sprinters
Athletes (track and field) at the 2004 Summer Olympics
Athletes (track and field) at the 2008 Summer Olympics
Olympic athletes of Nigeria
Olympic bronze medalists for Nigeria
Athletes (track and field) at the 2006 Commonwealth Games
Medalists at the 2004 Summer Olympics
Olympic bronze medalists in athletics (track and field)
African Games silver medalists for Nigeria
African Games medalists in athletics (track and field)
Athletes (track and field) at the 2007 All-Africa Games
Commonwealth Games competitors for Nigeria
20th-century Nigerian people
21st-century Nigerian people